Basketball at the 2008 Summer Olympics was the seventeenth appearance of the sport of basketball as an official Olympic medal event. It was held from 9 August to 24 August 2008.  Competitions were held at the Wukesong Indoor Stadium in Beijing, China.

Medalists

Medal count

Flag bearers
Basketball players that carried their flags at the opening ceremony were Yao Ming (for the People's Republic of China), Šarūnas Jasikevičius (for Lithuania), Dirk Nowitzki (for Germany), Andrei Kirilenko (for the Russian Federation), and Manu Ginóbili (for Argentina).

Events
Two sets of medals were awarded in the following events:
Basketball – Men
Basketball – Women

Qualification
A NOC may enter up to one men's team with 12 players and up to one women's team with 12 players. The reigning world champions and the host country qualify automatically, as do the winners of the five continental championships (plus the men's runners-up from Europe and the Americas).

The best teams from the continental championships that did not automatically qualify participated in the FIBA World Olympic Qualifying Tournament or FIBA World Olympic Qualifying Tournament for Women to determine the final spots in Beijing.

Italicized teams qualified via the wildcard tournaments.

Basketball – Men

Basketball – Women

Format
 Twelve teams are split into two preliminary round groups of six teams each.
 The top four teams from both groups qualify for the knockout stage. 
 Fifth-placed teams from both groups are ranked 9th–10th by basis of their records.
 Sixth-placed teams from both groups are ranked 11th–12th by basis of their records.
 In the quarterfinals, the matchups are as follows: A1 vs. B4, A2 vs. B3, A3 vs. B2 and A4 vs. B1.
 The eliminated teams at the quarterfinals are ranked 5th–8th by basis of their preliminary round records
 The winning teams from the quarterfinals meet in the semifinals as follows: A1/B4 vs. A3/B2 and A2/B3 vs. A4/B1.
 The winning teams from the semifinals contest the gold medal. The losing teams contest the bronze.

Tie-breaking criteria:
 Head to head results
 Goal average (not the goal difference) between the tied teams
 Goal average of the tied teams for all teams in its group

Calendar

Rosters

Each team is limited to twelve players on its roster.

Men

Preliminary round
The four best teams from each group advanced to the quarterfinal round.

Group A

Group B

Tournament bracket

Women

Preliminary round

The four best teams from each group advanced to the quarterfinal round.

Group A

Group B

Tournament bracket

Final standings

See also
Wheelchair basketball at the 2008 Summer Paralympics

References

External links
FIBA's Complete coverage of the Olympic Basketball Tournament
Beijing 2008 Olympic Games
International Basketball Federation
FIBA-Results of the Draw for the Beijing 2008 Olympic Basketball tournaments
Updated Women's Draw after Qualifying Tournament
Basketball – Official Results Book

 
Olympics
2008 Summer Olympics events
2008
International basketball competitions hosted by China